Popara is a Serbian surname. Notable people with the surname include:

Pavle Popara (born 1987), Serbian footballer
Nikola Popara (born 1992), Bosnian footballer

See also
Poparić

Serbian surnames